is a city located in Gifu, Japan. , the city had an estimated population of 110,070 in 46,580 households, and a population density of 1200 people per km2. The city is famous for its production of Mino ware ceramics, especially in the Oribe and Seto styles. Tajimi is a member of the World Health Organization’s Alliance for Healthy Cities  (AFHC).

Geography
Tajimi is located on the southern border of Gifu Prefecture with Aichi Prefecture. The  Kiso River and the Shōnai River flow through the city.

Climate
The city has a climate characterized by hot and humid summers, and relatively cold winters (Köppen climate classification Cfa).

Neighbouring municipalities
Gifu Prefecture
Toki
Kani
Aichi Prefecture
Kasugai
Seto
Inuyama

Mountains 

 Mt. Takane (556.3 m) The highest peak in the city.
 Kasahara Fuji (471.8 m) -The second highest peak, on the border with Seto City in Shiomi Park .
 Mt. Hogetsu (456.5 m)
 Mt. Miroku (436.6m) - located on the border with Kasugai City, on the Tōkai Nature Trail.
 Mt. Doju (429 m)
 Mt. Kosha (416.6 m)
 Mt. Sengen (372 m)
 Mt. Takane (225.6 m)

Rivers 

 Kiso River
 Shōnai River 
 Kasahara River
 Ohara River
 Shinzawa River
 Ichinokura River
 Gojō River

Demographics
Per Japanese census data, the population of Tajimi peaked around the year 2000 and has declined since.

History
The area around Tajimi was part of traditional Mino Province.  During the Edo period, much of the area was tenryō territory under the direct control of Tokugawa shogunate.  In the post-Meiji restoration cadastral reforms, Toki District in Gifu Prefecture was created, and the town of Tajimi was established on July 1, 1889 by the creation of the modern municipalities system. Tajimi annexed the town of Toyota from neighbouring Kani District in 1934, and was raised to city status on August 1, 1940.

Tajimi subsequently annexed the villages of Koizimi and Ikeda from Kani District in 1944, and the villages of Ichinokura and Kasahara from Toki District in 1951. On January 23, 2006 the town of Kasahara (from Toki District) was merged into Tajimi.

Government

Tajimi has a mayor-council form of government with a directly elected mayor and a unicameral city legislature of 24 members.

Economy
Tajimi is traditionally known for ceramics, mostly ceramic tiles and tableware, although due to increasing competitive pressures, especially from imported sources, only a few producers remain within the city limits, and economic activity in ceramics is increasingly orientated towards trade and wholesaling.

Education
Tajimi has 13 public elementary schools and eight public middle schools operated by the city government and one private combined middle/high school. The city has three public high schools operated by the Gifu Prefectural Board of Education. The Nagoya Institute of Technology has a campus in Tajimi.

Transportation

Railway
 - JR Central - Chūō Main Line
 -  
 - JR Central - Taita Line
   -  -  -

Highway
 Chūō Expressway

Sister City relations
 - Terre Haute, Indiana, United States, since September 1962

Local attractions
Eihō-ji, a Zen monastery
Museum of Modern Ceramic Art, Gifu
Mino International Ceramics Festival (every three years)

References

External links

 

Cities in Gifu Prefecture
 Tajimi